Academy is an unincorporated community in Charles Mix County, in the U.S. state of South Dakota.

History
A post office called Academy was established in 1899. The community took its name from the Ward Academy, which was once located there. A small one-room elementary school and two farms are all that remain at Academy in the 21st century.

References

Unincorporated communities in Charles Mix County, South Dakota
Unincorporated communities in South Dakota